The Fraser Canyon Indian Administration is a First Nations tribal council government composed of five bands in the Fraser Canyon and Thompson Canyon areas of the Canadian province of British Columbia.

Other Nlaka'pamux governments belong to either the Nicola Tribal Association or the Nlaka'pamux Nation Tribal Council, although the Lytton First Nation, which is the government of the largest Nlaka'pamux community, does not belong to any of the three.

Member bands

Kanaka Bar Indian Band
Skuppah First Nation (near Lytton)
Spuzzum First Nation
Nicomen Indian Band (also a member of the Scw’exmx Tribal Council)

Treaty process

History

Demographics

Economic development

Social, educational and cultural programs and facilities

See also

Nlaka'pamux
Thompson language
Nlaka'pamux Nation Tribal Council
Nicola Tribal Association
Fraser Canyon War
List of tribal councils in British Columbia

References

First Nations tribal councils in British Columbia
Nlaka'pamux governments
Fraser Canyon